Civil Services (Main) Examination, 2022 -Summan Letter

संघ लोक सेवा आयोग, धौलपुर हाउस शाहजहाँ रोड. नई दिल्ली 110069

UNION PUBLIC SERVICE COMMISSION, DHOLPUR HOUSE. SHAHJAHAN ROAD, NEW DELHI-110069

व्यक्तित्व परीक्षण हेतु ई-समन पत्र / e-SUMMON LETTER FOR PERSONALITY TEST

सिविल सेवा (प्रधान) परीक्षा, 2022/ Civil Services (Main) Examination, 2022

नाम

Name

GAUTAM KUMAR

अनुक्रमांक

8008490

Roll No

पिता का नाम

FEKU PRASAD

Father's Name

व्यक्तित्व परीक्षण की तिथि

FRIDAY, MAR 10, 2023

Dute of Personality Test व्यक्तित्व परीक्षण का समय

FORENOON AT 0900 HRS

Time of Personality Test

परीक्षण का स्थान Venue of Personality Test

UINION PUBLIC SERVICE COMMISSION, DHOLPUR HOUSE. SHAHJAHAN ROAD NEW DELHI-110069

1. [सिवित सेवा (प्रधान) परीक्षा 2023 के व्यक्तित्व परीक्षण स्तर पर आपका प्रवेश उक्त परीक्षा के लिए निर्धारित पात्रता शर्तों को पूरा करने के अधीन पूर्णतया अनंतिम है। यदि व्यक्तित्व परीक्षण के पहले या बाद में किसी भी समय सत्यापन करने पर पाया जाता है कि आप पात्रता की किसी शर्त को पूरा नहीं करते हैं और या आप आयु योग्यता लिए गए अवसरों आदि के संबंध में कोई मिथ्या कथन करते है तो आयोग द्वारा परीक्षा के लिए आपकी उम्मीदवारी रद्द कर दी जाएगी और आप दिनांक 10-3-2023को भारत का राजपत्र असाधारण भाग खंड में प्रकाशित सिविल सेवा परीक्षा नियमावली, 2022के नियम 14 के अंतर्गत कार्रवाई के भागी होंगे।

Your Admission at the stage of Personality Test of the Civil Services (Main) Examination, 2022 is purely parvisional subject to your safidying proscribed

eligibility condition for the said examination. If on verification at any time before or after the Penonality Test, it is found that you do not fulfill any of the

eligibility conditions and or made false statement regarding age qualification/no. of chances availed etc. your candidature for the examination will be

cancelled by the Commission and you would render yourself liable to be proceeded under Rule14 of the Rule for the Civil Services Examination, 2022

published in the Gazette of India Extrandinary Part-1 Section 1 on 27.04.2022

2. आप यह भी नोट कर ले कि व्यक्तित्व परीक्षण की तारीख व समय में परिवर्तन के किसी अनुरोध पर सामान्यतः विचार नहीं किया जाएगा। यदि आप निर्दिष्ट तारीख तथा समय पर व्यक्तित्व परीक्षण बोर्ड के समक्ष उपस्थित होने में असफल रहते हैं तो आपको व्यक्तित्व परीक्षण में अनुपस्थित माना जायेगा। इस संबंध में आगे कोई पत्राचार नहीं किया जायेगा। 2. You should note that no request for change in the date and time of the Personality Test will be ordinarily entertained. In case you fail to present younelf before the Personality Test Board on the schedule date and time, you will liable to be treated as Absent at Prsonality Test. No further corespondence will be made in this regant

3. जब आप व्यक्तित्व परीक्षण के लिए आए तो कृपया इस पत्र को साथ लाएं और अपने आगमन की रिपोर्ट स्वागत कक्ष गेट न संघ लोक सेवा आयोग धौलपुर हाउस शाहजहाँ रोड

नई दिल्ली को दें। यदि आप ऐसा करने में असफल होते है तो आपको आयोग परिसर में प्रवेश नहीं मिलेगा । 3. Please bring this letter with you when you come for Personality Test and report at Reception at Gate [No.1 [UPSC] Dholpur House, New Delhi Failure to

de so may result in denial of entry into Commission premises

कृपया नोट करें कि यदि आप अपनी आयु शैक्षणिक या जाति श्रेणी तथा शारीरिक विकलांगता की स्थिति आयु में रियायत आदि के समर्थन में मूल दस्तावेज लाने में विफल रहते हैं तो आपको व्यक्तित्व परीक्षण के लिए उपस्थित होने की अनुमति नहीं प्रदान की जाएगी और आपको यात्रा भने दैनिक भत्ते का भुगतान नहीं किया जाएगा। मूत्त प्रमाण पत्र सत्यापन के बाद वापस लौटा दिए जाएंगे। 4. Please note that in case you fail to bring original documents in support of your age, educational qualificationts) caste/category and PH states, age

relaxation me, you may not be allowed to appear for Personality Test and No TADA will be paid. The original certificates will be returned after

verification

5. कृपया नोट करें कि चिकित्सा परीक्षण को अधूरा छोड़ने पर आपकी उम्मीदवारी रद्द की जा सकती है। उपस्थिति स्लिप अनुबंध 1) में दिए गए चिकित्सा परीक्षण उपस्थिति प्रमाण को चिकित्सा परीक्षण की समाप्ति पर तत्काल ई-मेल आईडी mpidoptin nic.in, donist or nic.in पर भेज दे उपस्थिति स्लिप की मूल प्रति को चिकित्सा परीक्षण की समाप्ति के दिन के भीतर व्यक्तिगत रूप से अथवा स्पीड पोस्ट के माध्यम से आयोग को भेजा जाए। ऐसा करने में विफल रहने पर आप की उम्मीदवारी रद्द कर दी जाएगी।

5. You should note that leaving the medical examination incomplete would render you liable fur cancellation of your candidature. Proof of attending the medical examination in Attendance Slip (Annexure-1) should be, un completion of the medical examination, mailed to e-mail houvais- dopt a nic.in, donisljanic in Original Copy of attendance slip should be submitted by hand or by speed post to the Commission within 3 days of the date of completion of the medical examination. Failure in this regard would lead to cancellation of candidatury.

6. उम्मीदवारों को सलाह दी जाती है कि इस पत्र के साथ सत्ता जांच सूची तथा विस्तृत अनुदेश के अनुसार अपने दस्तावेजों की जांच कर लें। 6. Candidates are advised to check the documents in accordance with Check List' and 'Detailed Intractions' enclosed with this letter.

अवर सचिव Under Secretary

External links 
 Street map 

Populated places in Győr-Moson-Sopron County